A hunting deity is a god or goddess in mythology associated with the hunting of animals and the skills and equipment involved.  They are a common feature of polytheistic religions.

Anglo-Saxon mythology
 Wōden, leader of the Wild Hunt

Aztec mythology 
 Mixcoatl, god of hunting.
 Opochtli, god of fishing.

Celtic mythology
 Arawn, king of Annwn in some Welsh legends and associated with hunting, dogs and stags
 Cernunnos, a horned god associated with fertility and hunting
 Gwyn ap Nudd, another king of Annwn in Welsh Mythology, associated with the Wild Hunt
 Nodens, god associated with healing, the sea, hunting and dogs
 Vosegus, Gaulish god of hunting and forests; gives his name to the Vosges region

Chinese mythology
 Fu Xi, the creator of fishery.
 Jiang Ziya, a god of fishery.

Egyptian mythology
 Neith, goddess of war and the hunt
 Pakhet, a lioness huntress deity, whom the Greeks associated with Artemis
 Wepwawet, god of hunting and war, along with funerary practices
Bastet, a cat goddess and natural hunter of reptiles and rodents. Greeks often associated her with Artemis, giving her the name Ailuros.

Filipino mythology

Abog: the Bagobo god of hunters
Alagaka: the Tagalog protector of hunters
Anlabban: the Isnag deity who looks after the general welfare of the people; special protector of hunters
Amanikable: the Tagalog god of the sea who was spurned by the first mortal woman; also a god of hunters
Bakero & Tawo-nga-talonon: Ati spirits of the forest; the first-fruits sacrifices of the hunt are offered to them through bits of meat, which would bring good luck to the people
Cain: the Bugkalot headhunter creator of mankind; gave customs to the people; lived together with Abel in the sky but separated due to a quarrel
Esa’: a Batak ancestor whose movements created the landscapes, which he named during a hunting journey with his dogs, who were after wild pigs
Ga’ek Spirits: Bugkalot spirits in the Ga’ek magic plant used in relation to hunting and fishing; the naw-naw prayer is given to them
Kabigat: the Bontok goddess of the moon who cut off the head of Chal-chal's son; her action is the origin of headhunting
Kalao: Bugkalot spirit birds; depicted as red hornbills who guide and protect hunters and their soul
Kedes: the Aeta god of the hunt
Okot: the Bicolano forest god whose whistle would lead hunters to their prey
Paglingniyalan: the Tagalog god of hunters
Sugudun: also called Sugujun; the Manobo god of hunters and trappers
True: the Mamanwa deity of the forest and herder of hunting animals

Finnish mythology
 Mielikki, goddess of forests and the hunt
 Nyyrikki, god of the hunt
 Tapio, East Finnish forest spirit to whom men prayed before a hunt

Georgian mythology
 Apsat, god of the hunt, associated with fish and birds
 Dali, goddess of the hunt, associated with horned beasts of the mountain

Greek mythology
 Aristaeus, god of bee-keeping, cheese-making, herding, olive-growing and hunting
 Artemis, goddess of the hunt, wild animals and the moon
 Pan, in addition to being a god of the wild and shepherds, was also a hunting god.
 Persephone, the goddess of life and death, also known for being Hades' wife

Hindu mythology
 Banka-Mundi, goddess of the hunt and fertility
 Bhadra, god of hunting, one of Shiva's ganas
 Rudra, Rigvedic god associated with wind or storm, and the hunt

Hittite mythology
 Rundas, god of the hunt and good fortune

Inuit mythology
 Arnakuagsak, goddess responsible for ensuring the hunters were able to catch enough food and that the people remained healthy and strong
 Arnapkapfaaluk, sea goddess who inspired fear in hunters
 Nerrivik, the sea mother and patron of fishermen and hunters
 Nujalik, goddess of hunting on land
 Pinga, goddess of the hunt, fertility, and medicine
 Sedna, goddess of the sea, marine animals, and sea hunting
 Tekkeitsertok, god of hunting and master of caribou

Mbuti mythology
 Khonvoum, supreme god of the Mbuti  people in central Africa; the "great hunter"

Mesoamerican mythology
 Ah Tabai, Maya god of the hunt and more!
 Mixcoatl, Aztec god of hunting
 Sip, a hunting god often shown with deer ears and antlers
 Yum Kaax, Maya god of the forest and the protector of game animals

Norse mythology

 Skaði, a jötunn and goddess associated with bowhunting, skiing, winter, and mountains
 Ullr Norse god of hunting, mountains, archery, and skiing.

Roman mythology
 Diana, goddess of the hunt, wild animals and the wilderness; the counterpart of Artemis, goddess of the hunt and wild; twin sister of Apollo, daughter of Leto and Jupiter

Siberian mythology
 Bugady Musun, Evenki mother goddess of animals
 Hinkon, Tungusic lord of the hunt

Slavic mythology
 Devana, goddess of the hunt; the Slavic equivalent of the Roman goddess Diana

Thracian mythology
 Bendis, goddess of the hunt and the moon, whom the Greeks associated with Artemis.
 Thracian horseman, a hunting god on horseback.

Yoruba mythology
 Ogoun or loa, the Two-Spirit orisha who presides over fire, iron, hunting, politics and war
 Oshosi, the orisha also known as the "hunter of a single arrow", also the deity of the forests.
 Yoruba mythology Etymology: from the Yoruba people in West Africa to include the countries Nigeria and Benin, foreparents to practices or Santería, Lucumí, and other religions of the Caribbean, and the Americas.

Other
 Herne the Hunter, leader of the Wild Hunt.
 The Horned God, the Neopagan god of the sun, masculinity, nature, and hunting.

See also
Lord of the animals

References

 
 
Hunting deities
Deities